The Rifle Street drill hall is a former military installation in Oldham.

History
The building was designed as the headquarters of the 6th Volunteer Battalion, The Manchester Regiment and completed in 1897. This unit evolved to become the 10th Battalion, The Manchester Regiment in 1908. The battalion was mobilised at the drill hall in August 1914 before being deployed to Gallipoli and, ultimately, to the Western Front. The battalion converted to form the 41st (Oldham) Battalion, Royal Tank Regiment just before the Second World War and evolved to become the 40th/41st Royal Tank Regiment in 1956. After the cut-backs in 1967, the presence at the drill hall was reduced to a single squadron, A Squadron,  The Duke of Lancaster's Own Yeomanry (Royal Tank Regiment). After the squadron moved out of the drill hall in the mid-1990s, it continued to be used for industrial purposes until it was badly damaged in a serious fire in April 2011.

References

Buildings and structures in Oldham
Drill halls in England
Manchester Regiment